Noman M. Benotman (born 1967) is a former fighter of the Libyan militant organization known as the Libyan Islamic Fighting Group. Benotman has been active in reforming his former terrorist comrades in prison, attempting to persuade them to renounce violence. He wrote an open letter to Osama bin Laden in 2010 repudiating al-Qaeda's use of violence, and calling on bin Laden to unilaterally halt all attacks. He is also a Senior Analyst (Strategic Communications) at Quilliam.

Childhood
Noman comes from a wealthy Tripolitania family that suffered under the Qaddafi government, during which Qaddafi confiscated many properties like land, houses, factories and buildings belonging to Noman's father and many other well known Libyan families that also lived a harsh life under the Qaddafi government.

Afghanistan
Benotman has lived a hard life, living in exile overseas during the Qaddafi government’s 42 years of power hold on Libya. During the 1980s, the beginning of Gaddafi's oppression on many Libyans, Noman fled Libya and decided to join the Jihad call to take up arms during the Soviet occupation in Afghanistan. He fought for an Islamic cause and made many friends in his teenaged life. After several years of fighting Communist Russians that invaded Afghanistan, the Jihad was a victory to all Muslims, and Russia withdrew its troops from Afghanistan.

Anti-Qaddafi armed opposition
Noman then realized with the knowledge gained fighting the Soviets in Afghanistan using guerilla combat tactics that his country was also occupied and needed to do the same in Libya, establishing a network of Libyans to fight Qaddafi and to overthrow the government from power establishment of the (LIFG) the Libyan Islamic fighting group came to birth in the late '80s early '90s their mission target was Qaddafi.  The LIFG was the most feared by from Qaddafi they have taken the war to his door using all tactics to combat Qaddafi and his forces in Libya.

Many attempts on Qaddafi's life were made during the government's 42 years of power but none were successful enough to end his life. Qaddafi used Libya's Oil reserves and all assets he could to stay in power to fight the LIFG Islamists and other Libyan organizations. Qaddafi was successful crushing the Revolt in the '90s and many LIFG members were caught captured and killed some served in Libya's Notorious famous Prison named Abou Sleem and awaiting death sentence.  The LIFG kept fighting until the September 11th attacks on the United States soil. It was a blow to the organization leaving America and the United Kingdom only to label the LIFG as a terrorist organization bringing all operation to overthrow Qaddafi from power to a full stop, reports showed that Bin Laden had funded the LIFG baking the group with funds and helping them obtain weapons.

Mediation with Qaddafi
In the beginning of 2007 with pressure from Libya by Qaddafi requesting the British government to hand over people Like Noman to Libyan Authorities labeling them terrorists, Noman was forced to fight for his life in London obtaining a UK citizenship helping Noman not to be extradited to Libya he was active in Politics and was chosen to mediate the release of his former comrades in arms, He had the support of the British government and was backed by the new slogan (de-radicalization of Hardcore Islamists) Qaddafi was shocked and frustrated by the UK and had no choice but to accept the British government proposal if he ever wanted back in the world international community.

Noman was very successful in mediating the release of his former comrades. Many regarded Noman as a traitor for dealing with the Qaddafi government during 2007/2010 mediation but he had no choice, in the end Noman saw his fellow Comrades as brothers and had to do something to save their lives.

Quillam Foundation and media profile
He is the president of Quillam Foundation in London. He has appeared on many TV channels as an expert in Terrorism and the Middle east, more recently as the expert on the Arab Spring and its effects; despite working with Saif ul Islam Gaddafi to free his comrades from the notorious prison named Abousleem. At the time of the start of the Libyan uprising, he was in Tripoli meeting with Saif Gaddafi with the supervision of the British government, calling some of the rebels 'Al Qaeda' operatives pointing to Mokhtar Belmokhtar as he had information during the Libyan uprising that some Islamic hardcore militant had entered Libya.

The Washington Post quoted Benotman in 2006 in a profile of Atiyah Abd al-Rahman, another Libyan exile who was to rise to a senior membership of Al Qaeda's leadership.
Benotman said that Atiyah had been taken captive by the Armed Islamic Group, in Algeria, in the mid 1990s.

References 

1967 births
Living people
Libyan al-Qaeda members
Libyan Islamists
Libyan emigrants to the United Kingdom
People from Tripoli, Libya